In mathematics, the Stirling polynomials are a family of polynomials that generalize important sequences of numbers appearing in combinatorics and analysis, which are closely related to the Stirling numbers, the Bernoulli numbers, and the generalized Bernoulli polynomials. There are multiple variants of the Stirling polynomial sequence considered below most notably including the Sheffer sequence form of the sequence, defined characteristically through the special form of its exponential generating function, and the Stirling (convolution) polynomials, which also satisfy a characteristic ordinary generating function and that are of use in generalizing the Stirling numbers (of both kinds) to arbitrary complex-valued inputs. We consider the "convolution polynomial" variant of this sequence and its properties second in the last subsection of the article. Still other variants of the Stirling polynomials are studied in the supplementary links to the articles given in the references.

Definition and examples

For nonnegative integers k, the Stirling polynomials, Sk(x), are a Sheffer sequence for   defined by the exponential generating function 

The Stirling polynomials are a special case of the Nørlund polynomials (or generalized Bernoulli polynomials)  each with exponential generating function

given by the relation .

The first 10 Stirling polynomials are given in the following table:
{| class="wikitable"
!k !! Sk(x)
|-
| 0 || 
|-
| 1 || 
|-
| 2 || 
|-
| 3 || 
|-
| 4 || 
|-
| 5 || 
|-
| 6 || 
|-
| 7 || 
|-
| 8 || 
|-
| 9 || 
|}
In particular, the article by I. Gessel and R. P. Stanley defines the modified Stirling polynomial sequences,  and  where  are the unsigned Stirling numbers of the first kind, in terms of the two Stirling number triangles for non-negative integers .

Properties

Below  denote the Bernoulli polynomials and  the Bernoulli numbers under the convention   denotes a Stirling number of the first kind; and  denotes Stirling numbers of the second kind.

Special values: 
If  and  then:  
If  and  then:  and: 

The sequence  is of binomial type, since  Moreover, this basic recursion holds: 
Explicit representations involving Stirling numbers can be deduced with Lagrange's interpolation formula:  Here,  are Laguerre polynomials.
The following relations hold as well:  
By differentiating the generating function it readily follows that

Stirling convolution polynomials

Definition and examples

Another variant of the Stirling polynomial sequence corresponds to a special case of the convolution polynomials studied by Knuth's article  
and in the Concrete Mathematics reference. We first define these polynomials through the Stirling numbers of the first kind as

It follows that these polynomials satisfy the next recurrence relation given by

These Stirling "convolution" polynomials may be used to define the Stirling numbers,  and 
The next table provides several special cases of these Stirling polynomials for the first few .

{| class="wikitable" style="text-align: left;"
! n !! σn(x)
|-
| 0 || 
|-
| 1 || 
|-
| 2 || 
|-
 | 3 || 
|-
 | 4 || 
|-
 | 5 || 
|-
 | 6 || 
|-
 | 7 || 
|-
 | 8 || 
|-
 | 9 || 
|-
 | 10 || 
|-
|}

Generating functions

This variant of the Stirling polynomial sequence has particularly nice ordinary generating functions of the following forms:

More generally, if  is a power series that satisfies , we have that

We also have the related series identity 

and the Stirling (Sheffer) polynomial related generating functions given by

Properties and relations

and

When , we also have that the polynomials, are defined through their relations to the Stirling numbers

and their relations to the Bernoulli numbers given by

See also
 Bernoulli polynomials
 Bernoulli polynomials of the second kind
 Sheffer and Appell sequences
 Difference polynomials
 Special polynomial generating functions
 Gregory coefficients

References

External links
 
 
 

Polynomials